The Flaeming Air FA 04 Peregrine is a German ultralight and light-sport aircraft, designed and produced by Flaeming Air of Zellendorf, Brandenburg. The aircraft is supplied as a complete ready-to-fly-aircraft.

Design and development
The aircraft was designed to comply with the Fédération Aéronautique Internationale microlight rules and US light-sport aircraft rules, with different models for each category. It features a cantilever low-wing, a two-seats-in-side-by-side configuration enclosed cockpit under a bubble canopy, fixed tricycle landing gear, or optionally conventional landing gear and a single engine in tractor configuration.

The aircraft is made from composites, with its fuselage, wing spars, flaps and rudder made from carbon fibre. The standard engines available are the  Rotax 912ULS,  Jabiru 3300 and the  Continental O-200 four-stroke powerplants.

The FA 04 can be used for aero-towing gliders up to  gross weight.

Variants
FA 01 Smaragd (Emerald)
FA 02
FA 04 Peregrine
FA 04 SL

Specifications (FA 04 Peregrine)

References

External links

2000s German ultralight aircraft
Homebuilt aircraft
Light-sport aircraft
Single-engined tractor aircraft